John Henry Kearns (April 1880 – January 1949), also known as Jack Kearns, was an English professional footballer who played as a full back.

Kearns was born in Nuneaton, Warwickshire, in April 1880. He made nearly 200 appearances in the Football League playing for Birmingham, Aston Villa and Bristol City. While at Birmingham he understudied Frank Stokes and Jack Glover, but was first choice at Bristol City, for whom he played nearly 100 league games. Kearns died in Walsall, Staffordshire, in January 1949, at the age of 68.

References

1880 births
1949 deaths
Sportspeople from Nuneaton
English footballers
Association football fullbacks
Coventry City F.C. players
Birmingham City F.C. players
Aston Villa F.C. players
Bristol City F.C. players
English Football League players